Pilyaki (Kaitag: Пилахъи; Dargwa: Пиляхъи) is a rural locality (a selo) in Kirtsiksky Selsoviet, Kaytagsky District, Republic of Dagestan, Russia. The population was 29 as of 2010.

Geography 
Pilyaki is located 30 km south of Madzhalis (the district's administrative centre) by road. Kirtsik and Varsit are the nearest rural localities.

Nationalities 
Dargins live there.

References 

Rural localities in Kaytagsky District